Raiske is an urban-type settlement in Kramatorsk Raion of Donetsk Oblast, Ukraine. Population:  

Until 18 July 2020, Rayske was located in Druzhkivka Municipality. The municipality was abolished that day as part of the administrative reform of Ukraine, the number of raions of Donetsk Oblast was reduced to eight, of which only five were controlled by the government. Druzhkivka Municipality was merged into Kramatorsk Raion.

References

Urban-type settlements in Kramatorsk Raion